The DyDo Drinco Ice Arena (ダイドードリンコ アイスアリーナ) is an indoor  sporting arena located in Nishitōkyō, Tokyo, Japan. The arena opened in 1984. It has a capacity of 3,500 people (2,482 seated and 1,018 standing). It was the home ice of the now defunct Seibu Prince Rabbits, an Asia League Ice Hockey team.

The Osaka based beverage company DyDo acquired the naming right of the arena, originally named , in 2006.

The arena is located in front of Higashi-Fushimi Station, a station of the Seibu Shinjuku Line connecting Shinjuku, Tokyo with Kawagoe, Saitama. The line is operated by Seibu Railway, the owner of the arena and the Prince Rabbits team.

References

 Seibu Group 
 Nishitōkyō City Web
 Japanese Hockey Arenas 

Nishitōkyō, Tokyo
Indoor ice hockey venues in Japan
Indoor arenas in Japan
Sports venues in Tokyo
Sports venues completed in 1984
1984 establishments in Japan
Seibu Group